Jefferson Park may refer to several places:

 Jefferson Park, Los Angeles, California, a neighborhood 
 Jefferson Park (Bakersfield), California, a city park
 Jefferson Park, Pasadena, California, a neighborhood
 Jefferson Park, Denver, Colorado, a neighborhood and park
 Jefferson Park, Chicago, Illinois, a neighborhood
Jefferson Park (Chicago), Illinois, a city park
Jefferson Park Transit Center, a bus terminal and railroad station
 Jefferson Park, New Jersey, an unincorporated community
 Jefferson Park (Seattle), Washington, a city park
 Jefferson Park (Oregon), meadows north of Mount Jefferson in the Oregon Cascades
 Thomas Jefferson Park, New York City, a city park